John Kavanagh may refer to:

 John Kavanagh (actor) (born c. 1940s), Irish actor
 John Kavanagh (Arizona politician) (born 1950), American politician from Arizona
 John Kavanagh (bishop) (1913–1985), Catholic Bishop of Dunedin, 1949–1985
 John Kavanagh (martial artist) (born 1977), Irish martial arts coach
 John Kavanagh (Newfoundland politician) (1814–1884), Newfoundland politician
 John Francis Kavanagh (1903–1984), Irish sculptor and artist

See also
 John Kavanaugh (fl. 1980s–2010s), American composer, lyricist and musical director
 Jack Kavanagh (disambiguation)
 John Cavanagh (disambiguation)
 John Cavanaugh (disambiguation)